Luis Ceballos may refer to:

Luis Ceballos y Fernández de Córdoba (1896–1967), Spanish forest engineer and botanist
Luis Ceballos (footballer), Chilean footballer